The year 2019 is the 238th year of the Rattanakosin Kingdom of Thailand. It is the fourth year in the reign of King Vajiralongkorn (Rama X), and is reckoned as year 2562 in the Buddhist Era.

A general election, the first since the ruling military junta took power by coup in 2014, took place on 24 February. The coronation of King Maha Vajiralongkorn happened on 4–6 May.

Incumbents
 King: Vajiralongkorn 
 Prime Minister: Prayut Chan-o-cha
 Supreme Patriarch: Ariyavongsagatanana VIII

Events

January
 5 January - Rahaf Mohammed was detained by Thai authorities whilst transiting through Bangkok airport, en route from Kuwait to Australia. She was attempting to flee her family and seek asylum in Australia because she says they subjected her to physical and psychological abuse, and is concerned that she could be killed if deported back to her native Saudi Arabia.

February 

 11 February - King's sister is disqualified from the election.

April 

 30 April - Director named for the Netflix story of the Thai cave rescue

May 

 4 May - The coronation of King Maha Vajiralongkorn Bodindradebayavarangkun takes place.

June 

 11 June - Thai women's soccer team play the U.S. team in the World Cup and lost 13–0. Even though it was the biggest loss to date in World Cup history, Thai supporters were still happy to be there and participating in the event.

August
 2 August - 2019 Bangkok bombings

November

 6 November - Gunmen killed 15 people, mostly Village Defence Volunteers, in Yala Province.

Deaths

May
 May 7 – Prasert na Nagara, Thai scholar (b. 1919)
 May 26 – Prem Tinsulanonda, 16th Prime Minister of Thailand and Regent of Thailand (b. 1920)

References

 
2010s in Thailand
Years of the 21st century in Thailand
Thailand
Thailand